Allan's Illustrated Edition of Tyneside Songs and Readings is a book of Tyneside popular and traditional songs consisting of approximately 400 song lyrics on over 600 pages, published in 1891. It was reprinted in 1972 by Frank Graham, Newcastle upon Tyne, with an introduction by David Harker.

Publication of Tyneside Songs
In 1862 Thomas Allan published the first book in this series, which was called "Tyneside songs". The first edition was very small and covered mainly songs of Edward “Ned” Corvan and George "Geordie" Ridley.

Over the years he developed the book, adding to it, until eventually it became an extremely large volume with almost 600 pages and contained 400 songs. The name was changed to Allan's Tyneside Songs, and the contents increased to cover not just the songs but details and histories of them, their writers and singers. As it developed the theme changed from one of solely popular songs to encompass many older traditional songs, aiming to spread the popularity of the book to a wider audience. It is now an invaluable source of historical reference providing wealth of information.

The second edition followed in the following year of 1863.

1864 saw the third edition now entitled "A choice collection of Tyneside songs by E. Corvan, G. Ridley, J.P. Robson, R Emery ... etc.”.

1872, a further edition was published.

The edition of 1873 was called "A choice collection of Tyneside songs by Wilson, Corvan, Mitford, Gilchrist, Robson, Harrison, Emery, Ridley, Oliver, Shield, &c,. &c., &c. with lives of the authors illustrated with views of the town and portraits of the poets and eccentrics of Newcastle." It was published by Allan, 62 Dean Street, Newcastle upon Tyne: & 16 Collingwood Street, North Shields. ("Ralph Allan, Tyne Street, Newcastle upon Tyne" was also mentioned on the cover, possibly as a seller)

The final edition was published in 1891 and was now called “Allan's illustrative edition of Tyneside Songs and readings with lives, portraits and autographs of the writers and notes on the songs.  Revised edition." The publisher was Thomas & George Allan, 18 Blackett Street and 34 Collingwood Street, Newcastle upon Tyne, and the cover stated that it was "Sold by W Allan, 80 Grainger Street & B Allan, North Shields: & W Scott of London."

Publication 
It is, as the title suggests, a collection of songs which would have been popular, or topical, at the date of publication. There is a considerable amount of additional material relating to biographies and very interesting articles on the lives of the authors, together with historical comments of the day which had influenced them in their choices of songs.

Contents 
The contents of the final (1891) edition are:

Notes
¹ – An old traditional song<br/ >
³ – Only a brief mention<br/ >
A-C1 – according to Thomas Allan's Tyneside Songs and Readings of 1891, the writer is George Cameron<br/ >
A-G2 – according to Thomas Allan's Tyneside Songs and Readings of 1891, the writer is Gilchrist<br/ >
Br-S6 – according to Brockie's “The Shields Garland", the writer is John Stobbs<br/ >
F-A1 – according to Fordyce's Tyne Songster of 1840, the writer is Armstrong<br/ >
Fr-Tune7 – according to France's Songs of the Bards of the Tyne - 1850, the tune is "Polly Parker, O"<br/ >
Fr-Tune8 – according to France's Songs of the Bards of the Tyne - 1850, the tune is "Newcastle Ale"

See also 
 Geordie dialect words
 Thomas Allan (publisher)
 The Bishoprick Garland 1834 by Sharpe
Northumbrian Minstrelsy
A Beuk o’ Newcassell Sangs Collected by Joseph Crawhall 1888
Rhymes of Northern Bards

References

External links
 Allan's Illustrated Edition of Tyneside Songs and Readings

English folk songs
Songs related to Newcastle upon Tyne
Northumbrian folklore